Sanjay Khosla is a senior fellow, Kellogg School of Management, Northwestern University, USA and a senior advisor and Boston Consulting Group.

Khosla was president, developing markets of Kraft Foods (now Mondelez International) from Jan 2007 to March 2013, responsible for 65,000 people in over 60 countries and brands like Cadbury, Oreo, Milka, Trident. During his tenure, Khosla:
 Transformed the business from $5 billion to $16 billion in six years (doubled the business organically) while dramatically improving profitability and cash flow 
 Transformed brands like Oreo from $200 million to a $1 Billion and Tang from $500 million to $1 Billion in six years in developing markets 
 Helped spearhead and successfully integrate the acquisition of Cadbury (bought for $20 Billion) and Danone biscuits (bought for $7.8 Billion) 

Before joining Kraft Foods, Khosla turned around the $3 billion consumer business of Fonterra, a global dairy company based in New Zealand. Prior to his tenure at Fonterra, Khosla enjoyed a successful 27-year career with Unilever based in the UK, Europe and India. Khosla implemented a bold programme (Paint the World Yellow with Lipton) as chairman of the Global Category Board for Unilever Beverages. Khosla also created the Wheel detergents business in India, which is one of Unilever's largest brands in India.

Khosla is on the board of Zoetis Inc (previously Pfizer animal health), NIIT Ltd, India, and Iconix Brand Group. Khosla was previously on the Board of Best Buy Inc, Del Monte Foods, and Hindustan Unilever; co-chair of the Nestle/Fonterra joint venture for the Americas; and on the board of the Lipton /Pepsi joint venture.

Khosla has lectured extensively at universities in the U.S. and in forums such as the Economist conference in London and Davos.

Khosla co-authored a book, Fewer, Bigger, Bolder, with Mohanbir Sawhney. The book discusses Focus7, a "proven framework for achieving sustained profitable growth."

References

External links 
 Sanjay Khosla website
 New senior fellow: Kellogg appoints international business expert Sanjay Khosla as senior fellow
 Sanjay Khosla to Retire After Leading Developing Markets to New Heights

Living people
American people of Indian descent
American businesspeople
Year of birth missing (living people)